Jingfu (景福) may refer to:

Towns in China
Jingfu, Sichuan, in Santai County, Sichuan
Jingfu, Yunnan, in Jingdong Yi Autonomous County, Yunnan

Historical eras
Jingfu (892–893), era name used by Emperor Zhaozong of Tang
Jingfu (1031–1032), era name used by Emperor Xingzong of Liao